is a Japanese politician of the Liberal Democratic Party, a member of the House of Representatives in the Diet (national legislature). A native of Hiroshima, Hiroshima and graduate of Keio University, he ran unsuccessfully for the House of Representatives in 1993 after serving in the assembly of Hiroshima Prefecture. He ran again three years later and was elected for the first time, but lost the seat in 2000. He was re-elected in 2003. He was the Minister of Justice from 11 September 2019 to 31 October 2019. He stepped down as the Minister of Justice after reports of overpaying workers of Anri Kawai's political campaign beyond the legal limit.

On June 16, 2020, he and his wife, Anri Kawai, left the Liberal Democratic Party among allegations of buying votes to aid Anri Kawai's campaign for the House of Councilors. They were later arrested by public prosecutors on June 19, 2020, on charges for vote-buying and distributing around 25 million yen to 100 prefectural and city assembly members in Hiroshima in violation of the Public Office Elections Law.

In April 2021, Kawai resigned his position as Representative. On June 18, 2021, Kawai was sentenced to three years in prison and a fine of 1.3 million yen ($12,000) for vote buying.

Biography

Early years
Kawai was born in Mihara city, Hiroshima Prefecture, where he lived until kindergarten. The family rented two six-and-a-half mat rooms, and used the public bath. His elementary school years were in Asaminami Ward of Hiroshima, attending the Yasu Elementary School and then the Hiroshima Academy Junior and Senior High School.

In 1985 he graduated from the Faculty of Law at Keio University, specializing in political science, and then enrolled in The Matsushita Institute of Government and Management in Chigasaki. Among his classmates at the Institute were Nobuhiro Tanabe and Toshiyuki Nara, the mayor of Echizen. In 1988 he gained experience as an international trainee of local government in Office of Management and Budget of Dayton, Ohio. In 1990 he graduated from the Matsushita Institute and returned to Hiroshima.

Early political career and marriage

In 1991 Kawai stood for election in Asaminami Ward, and was elected to the Hiroshima Prefectural Assembly.

During the 1993 Japanese general election his bid for the House of Representatives was unsuccessful, coming in sixth out of eight candidates. In the 1996 Japanese general election he succeed in defeating Yoshitake Masuhara of the New Frontier Party, becoming the representative of from Hiroshima District Three. However, he lost this position in the 2000 Japanese general election to his former opponent Yoshitake Masuhara (at that time not affiliated with any political party); his supporters pointed out, "The main reason for your defeat is that you are still single." During the period when he was still bemoaning his election loss, a friend introduced him to Anri Maeda, an employee of the Science and Technology Agency; they had supper together in Tokyo, then went to a karaoke snack bar in Akasaka, where Anri sang Amagi-goe. It was love at first sight, and they decided to start a serious relationship that night. On April 20, 2001, they held their wedding in a Hiroshima hotel.

Appointments to high offices
Subsequently, Masuhara joined the LDP, and the two rivals agreed to use the so-called "Costa Rica system" under Japan's parallel voting system, in which they alternated running in the single-member tier or the proportional representation (PR) tier. In the 2003 election Kawai ran in the PR block, coming in second and thus returning to the National Diet, where he served as parliamentary secretary for the Ministry of Foreign Affairs under the Second and Third Koizumi Cabinets. In 2007, he became the State Minister of Justice in the First Abe Cabinet (2006–2007) and subsequent Fukuda Cabinet (2007-2008).

In the 2009 election he ran in the PR block, and was again elected. In June 2011 he joined the Kisaragi Kai, a newly formed political association centered on Kunio Hatoyama, who had been the Minister of Justice (2007-2008); Kawai served as chief secretary of the association.

Vote buying incident

Synopsis
Kawai Katsuyuki's wife Anri won a seat from the Hiroshima District in the 2019 Japanese House of Councillors election (21 July 2019), her first electoral win, against a background of Kawai's attempts to purchase votes for her between March and August of that year, distributing about 25.7 million yen ($280,000) in cash to about 100 politicians, mayors, and supporters. As a result of the election Kawai became Minister of Justice in the Fourth Realignment of the Second Stint Abe Cabinet, but as suspicions of voter bribery began to surface, he stepped down after six weeks (in office: 2019 September 11 until October 31). After further investigation, the final charges mentioned a total of 29 million yen to 100 officials.

Outcome
Katsuyuki Kawai In April 2021, Kawai resigned his position as Representative. On June 18, 2021, Kawai was sentenced to three years in prison and a fine of 1.3 million yen ($12,000) for vote buying. He began serving his term in the Tokyo Detention House.

Anri Kawai At the Tokyo District Court, on 20 January 2021, Anri Kawai was sentenced to a year and four months in prison, suspended for five years.

Recipients of bribes As of July 6, 2021, the Tokyo District Public Prosecutors Office is preparing to drop charges against all of the 100 local assembly members and others who allegedly received cash. Typically criminal charges will be brought against offenders who accept bribes of 1 million yen (about $9,024), but in this case arguments are being made that: (1) the bribes were forced on the recipients, and (2) they did not use the funds to buy votes (i.e. did not further distribute the funds through their political connections).

Other controversies

Three-month investigation of political opponent
In the election of October, 2017, Kawai defeated Ayaka Shiomura by a margin of 20,000 votes. Feeling this was too close for comfort, in the summer of 2018, Kawai hired a former police detective to follow Shiomura, hoping to uncover evidence of her financial irregularities or sexual relationships; the detective was engaged for three months. The detective testified that his fee of 700,000 yen was paid by Nihon no Yume Sozo Kiko (Organization for Creating a Dream of Japan, Kawai's financial support group), via a consulting firm in Yokohama According to the balance sheet of the financial support group, on July 27 and September 27, 2018, a total of 648,000 was paid to a company in Aioi-cho, Naka-ku, Yokohama.

Personal

In media reports following a 2016 incident in which Kawai was accused of power harassment of a secretary, an underclassman from his elementary school told the news media that, "Kawai's nickname was 'Suneo' (arrogant rich boy in Doraemon series). He was from a well-to-do family who had a drugstore, and held himself apart from the rest of us. Everybody loathed him."

Kawai attended the Hiroshima Academy Junior and Senior High School, a private Catholic school founded by the Jesuits. During the papacy of Pope Benedict XVI (2005-2013), he visited the Vatican a total of six times, requesting a papal visit to Japan.

When Kawai's mother died in 2005, the funeral and memorial services were held in the Catholic Gion Church in Gion, Asaminami-ku, Hiroshima, with Kawai as the chief mourner.

When first accused of violating the Public Office Election Law, Kawai denied his guilt, but during questioning on March 23, 2021, he admitted the guilt, saying that "I made this decision in consultation with a priest with whom I have been in contact for over 20 years."

References

External links

1963 births
Living people
People from Hiroshima
Keio University alumni
Members of the House of Representatives (Japan)
Liberal Democratic Party (Japan) politicians
21st-century Japanese politicians
Japanese politicians convicted of crimes
Politicians from Hiroshima Prefecture